German South Moravia was a historical region of Czechoslovakia.  It includes parts of southern and western Moravia once largely populated by ethnic Germans.

History

German South Moravia was historically an integral part of the Habsburg constituent Margraviate of Moravia. During the First World War it suffered military casualties in greater proportion than any other German speaking area of Austria-Hungary, experiencing 44 war deaths for every 1,000 inhabitants.  With the imminent collapse of Habsburg Austria-Hungary at the end of the war, areas of the Czech-majority Moravia with an ethnic German majority began to take actions to avoid joining a new Czechoslovak state.  German South Moravia was declared on 2 November 1918 with its capital at Znojmo.

On 11 November 1918, Emperor Charles I of Austria relinquished power and, on 12 November, the ethnic German areas of the empire were declared the Republic of German Austria with the intent of unifying with Germany. However, the area was quickly taken by the Czechoslovak army with Znojmo falling on 27 December 1918.

The status of German areas in Moravia and Bohemia was definitively settled by the 1919 peace treaties of Versailles and Saint-Germain-en-Laye that declared that the areas belong to Czechoslovakia. The Czechoslovak Government then granted amnesty for all activities against the new state.

The region was then integrated into the Moravian Land of the First Republic of Czechoslovakia and remained a part of it until the Nazi dismemberment of Czechoslovakia when it was added to Germany (Reichsgau Niederdonau).  After World War II, the area was returned to Czechoslovakia and is  part of Czech Republic. The near entirety of the German civilian population in German South Moravia—like the rest of Czechoslovakia—was forced out by Czechoslovaks from 1945-1948.

See also
Republic of German-Austria
Origins of Czechoslovakia
Province of the Sudetenland
Province of German Bohemia
Bohemian Forest Region

References

External links
 * Organisation of Germans from Southern Moravia ("Südmährischer Landschaftsrat")

Sudetenland
Republic of German-Austria
History of Moravia
States and territories disestablished in 1918
States and territories established in 1918